Elkins High School is an accredited comprehensive public high school located in Elkins, Arkansas, United States. The school provides secondary education for students in grades 9 through 12. It is one of ten public high schools in Washington County, Arkansas and the sole high school administered by the Elkins School District.

The high school's attendance boundary includes the majority of Elkins.

History 
The current building was first constructed in the 1950s. Some of the older features of the building is a long east-west hallway, which was created after the building was extended to enclose one side, and the resulting low, sharply angled roof.  The last significant architectural addition was in 1990. In May 2009, the Board voted to begin negotiations with an architecture firm to build a new school.

Academics 
The assumed course of study follows the Smart Core curriculum developed by the Arkansas Department of Education (ADE), which requires students complete at least 22 units prior to graduation. Students complete regular coursework and exams and may take Advanced Placement (AP) courses and exam with the opportunity to receive college credit. Elkins High School is accredited by the ADE.

Athletics 
The Elkins High School mascot is the Elk with purple and white serving as the school colors.

The Elkins Elks compete in interscholastic activities within the 3A Classification and within the 3A Region 1 Conference administered by the Arkansas Activities Association. The Elks field teams in football, cross country (boys/girls), golf (boys/girls), bowling (boys/girls), basketball (boys/girls), baseball, softball, track and field (boys/girls), baseball, and softball, along with competitive cheerleading.
 Cross country: The boys cross country teams won six consecutive state titles (2008, 2009, 2010, 2011, 2012, 2013). The girls cross country teams won consecutive state cross country championships in 2008 and 2009.
 Cheerleading: The competitive cheer squads have won 4 consecutive 3A Class state cheer championships from 2011 to 2014.
 Baseball: The Elks baseball squad won 2 state titles, one in 2006 and one in 2009 with a state runner-up in 2011.

References

External links 

 

School buildings completed in the 20th century
Public high schools in Arkansas
Schools in Washington County, Arkansas